Babella hastula is a species of sea snail, a marine gastropod mollusk in the family Pyramidellidae, the pyrams and their allies. The species is one of twelve known species in the Babella genus of gastropods.

Distribution
This marine species occurs off the coasts of Vietnam and the Gulf of Thailand.

References

 Odé, H. (1998). Indo-Pacific taxa of turbonilids, excluding those along the Americas. Texas Conchologist. 34 (2): 33–103

External links
 To World Register of Marine Species

Pyramidellidae
Gastropods described in 1961